Gouverneur's syndrome is characterised by vesicointestinal fistula with associated suprapubic pain, urinary frequency, pain on passing urine, and tenesmus. It is named after French physician R. Gouverneur.

References

Urinary bladder disorders
Syndromes